The 2008–09 Yemeni League was the 17th edition of top level football in Yemen.

Al-Hilal Al-Sahili won the championship on the final day of the season and qualified for the 2010 AFC Cup.

Final table

Yemeni League seasons
Yem
1